Pascal Kané (21 January 1946 – 31 August 2020) was a French film director and screenwriter. He studied in Paris before joining the editorial staff of Cahiers du Cinéma from 1969 to 1979.  He left Cahiers du Cinéma to concentrate on directing. In addition to numerous documentaries he has directed feature films including Dora et la lanterne magique, Liberty belle and Un jeu d’enfant. He lectured on cinema at Université Paris III.

Filmography
1973 : La mort de Janis Joplin
1975 : India Song
1976 : A propos de Pierre Rivière
1977 : Dora et la lanterne magique
1978 : La vocation suspendue
1980 : La Machine panoptique
1980 : Destination l’invisible
1981 : Chirico par Cocteau
1982 : La couleur de l’abime
1983 : Liberty Belle
1984 : Nouvelle suite venitienne
1986 : L’effet France aux USA
1987 : Le fantôme du theatre
1988 : La perle et les cochons
1988 : Dernier cri
1989 : L’Arche de la Défence
1989 : Un jeu d’enfant
1990 : La culture en chantier
1991 : Premier regard
1992 : Hector Guimard: un architecte et ses folies
2000 : La Théorie du Fantôme
2005 : Biblical Heroines in Painting (documentary) 
2010 : Je ne vous oublierai jamais

References

External links
 

1946 births
2020 deaths
People from Angoulême
French male film actors
French film directors
French male screenwriters
French screenwriters